Myrcia is a genus of plants in the family Myrtaceae, containing about 765 species as of 2022. They are distributed in Central and South America, Mexico, and the Caribbean, with centers of diversity in the Brazilian Cerrado and Atlantic Forests ecoregions. Myrcia was first described as a genus in 1827.

Selected species

Formerly placed here
 Plinia cauliflora (Mart.) Kausel (as M. jaboticaba Baill.)

References

External links

 
Myrtaceae genera
Taxa named by Augustin Pyramus de Candolle
Neotropical realm flora